Alpine were an Australian indie pop band from Melbourne, Victoria, formed in 2009.

History 
Alpine released their debut EP, Zurich, in November 2010.

Preceded by the "Hands" single in late 2011, their debut album, A Is for Alpine, was released in Australia in 2012 and in the US in 2013. The album was featured on Triple J prior to its release, and debuted at No. 11 on the ARIA chart.

The album's second single, "Gasoline", was released in July 2012. It reached No. 31 in the 2012 Triple J Hottest 100, and was described by Pitchfork as an "unforgettably light and charismatic gem".
Alpine were nominated for ARIA Award for Breakthrough Artist - Release and Best Video (for "Hands") at the 2012 ARIA Music Awards. They toured the United States in March 2013, playing shows in Los Angeles and New York City, and in September made their US television debut on Jimmy Kimmel Live!. At the APRA Music Awards of 2013, the band members were nominated for Breakthrough Songwriter of the Year.

Rolling Stone magazine called Alpine a "Band to Watch" in July 2013, and they were touted similarly by The Guardian, Time and Vice magazines, as well as influential radio programs KCRW and NPR's All Songs Considered.

The band's second album, Yuck, was released in 2015, reaching No. 16 on the Australian charts. Its lead single, "Foolish", came in at number 57 in that year's Hottest 100.

After an extended hiatus, Alpine returned in 2019 with a new single, "Dumb" on 1 May 2019. A week prior, the band had announced that founding member and co-lead vocalist Lou James would be departing from the band.

In December 2020, lead guitarist Christian O'Brien was charged with sexual assault regarding an incident on 2 August 2019. When releasing a statement of concern, the band revealed it had split up the year prior.

Band members 
 Phoebe Baker – vocals, keyboards (2009–2019), occasional guitar (2009–2012)
 Christian O'Brien – guitar (2009–2019), keyboards (2019)
 Ryan Lamb – bass (2009–2019), keyboards (2019)
 Tim Royall – keyboards, guitar, percussion (2009–2019)
 Phil Tucker – drums, percussion (2009–2019)
 Lou James – vocals, percussion (2009–2019)

Discography

Studio albums

Extended plays

Singles

Awards and nominations

AIR Awards
The Australian Independent Record Awards (commonly known informally as AIR Awards) is an annual awards night to recognise, promote and celebrate the success of Australia's Independent Music sector.

|-
| AIR Awards of 2012
|"Gasoline"
| Best Independent Single/EP
| 
|-

APRA Awards
The APRA Awards are presented annually from 1982 by the Australasian Performing Right Association (APRA), "honouring composers and songwriters".

|-
| 2013 
| Alpine
| Breakthrough Songwriter(s) of the Year
|

ARIA Music Awards
The ARIA Music Awards is an annual awards ceremony that recognises excellence, innovation, and achievement across all genres of the music of Australia.

|-
| rowspan="2"| 2012
| A Is for Alpine
| Breakthrough Artist - Release
| 
|-
| "Hands" (directed by Luci Schroder)
| Best Video
| 
|-
| 2013
| "Seeing Red"
| Engineer of the Year
| 
|-

EG Awards
The EG Awards are an annual awards night celebrating Victorian music.  They commenced in 2006.

|-
| rowspan="3"| EG Awards of 2012
| A Is for Alpine
| Best Album 
| 
|-
| "Villages"
| Best Song
| 
|-
| themselves
| Best Band
|

J Awards
The J Awards are an annual series of Australian music awards that were established by the Australian Broadcasting Corporation's youth-focused radio station Triple J. They commenced in 2005.

|-
| rowspan="2"| J Awards of 2012 
| A Is for Alpine
| Australian Album of the Year
| 
|-
| "Hands" (directed by Luci Schroder)
| Australian Video of the Year
| 
|-
| J Awards of 2015 
| Yuck
| Australian Album of the Year
|

References

External links 

  

Australian indie pop groups
Musical groups from Melbourne
Musical groups established in 2009